Never Gonna Snow Again is a 2020 Polish-German comedy-drama film directed by Małgorzata Szumowska and Michał Englert. It stars Alec Utgoff, Maja Ostaszewska, Agata Kulesza, Weronika Rosati, Katarzyna Figura, Andrzej Chyra, Łukasz Simlat, and Krzysztof Czeczot.

The film premiered at the 77th Venice International Film Festival, where it competed in the main competition. It was selected as the Polish entry for the Best International Feature Film at the 93rd Academy Awards, but failed to receive a nomination. It garnered seven Polish Film Award nominations, winning Best Cinematography.

Plot
While working as a masseur in a gated community in Poland, Zhenia, a Russian-speaking immigrant from the East unexpectedly builds a cult following.

Cast
 Alec Utgoff as Zhenia
 Maja Ostaszewska as Maria
 Agata Kulesza as Ewa
 Weronika Rosati as Wika / Zhenia's mother
 Katarzyna Figura as Gucci
 Andrzej Chyra as Captain
 Łukasz Simlat as Wika's husband
 Krzysztof Czeczot as Maria's husband

Critical reception
The website's critical consensus reads, "Led by Alec Utgoff's impressive starring performance, Never Gonna Snow Again blends elements of sci-fi, satire, and surreal drama with an assured hand." On Metacritic, the film has a weighted average score of 73 out of 100, based on 7 critics, indicating "generally favourable reviews".

The Guardian placed the film at number 35 on its list of the 50 best films of 2021 in the UK.

Regarding the character of Zhenia, Giuseppe Sedia wrote on Kino Mania: "Ukrainians are the biggest foreign community in Poland and are looked at by many as a mere workforce. Zhenia instead is welcomed as a wonderful alien, almost a messiah figure capable of manipulating and healing the bodies and maybe unintentionally, the souls of his clients".

See also
 List of submissions to the 93rd Academy Awards for Best International Feature Film
 List of Polish submissions for the Academy Award for Best International Feature Film

References

External links
 
 

2020 films
2020 comedy-drama films
Polish comedy-drama films
German comedy-drama films
2020s Polish-language films
2020s Russian-language films
Films directed by Małgorzata Szumowska
Films set in Poland
Films about immigration to Europe
Films about hypnosis
2020 multilingual films
Polish multilingual films
German multilingual films